Anne Charlotte de Lorraine-Brionne (1755-1786), was a German-Roman monarch as the reigning Princess Abbess of the Imperial Remiremont Abbey in France in 1782-1786.

Early life 
Born into cadet branch of the powerful House of Lorraine, she was the second daughter and third child of Louis de Lorraine, Prince of Lambesc, Count of Brionne and his third wife, Princess Louise Julie Constance of Rohan-Rochefort (1734-1815).

Reign 
She was elected Coadjutrice in 1775 and succeeded as Princess-Abbess of Remiremont in 1782. She visited the abbey for the first time in 1784 and rarely after that.

References 

1755 births
1786 deaths
Abbesses of Remiremont
Princesses of Lorraine
House of Lorraine